The cauliflower soft coral (Eunephthya thyrsoidea) is a species of colonial soft coral in the family Nephtheidae.

Description
Cauliflower soft corals grow in colonies of up to 30 centimeters in height. The polyps are 0.2 cm in diameter. It grows as a large whitish colony with side branches ending in bunches of grey- or brown-tinged polyps.

Distribution
This species is known from the Cape Peninsula to northern KwaZulu-Natal off the South African coast, and lives from 10 to 240m under water.

Ecology
This species is often found on vertical rockfaces and when not feeding it contracts tightly, and its resemblance to a cauliflower is striking. It is fed upon by the walking anemone, Preactis millardae.

References

Nephtheidae
Corals described in 1869